The Commander of the Republic of China Navy  is the highest-ranking military officer and commander of the Republic of China Navy in Taiwan.  The current Commander is Admiral Liu Chih-pin.

List

Minister of the Navy

Commander-in-Chief of the Navy

Commander of the Navy

References

Republic of China Navy officers
Taiwan